Viroqua Daniels (1859–1942), later Viroqua Daverkosen, was an anarchist writer in the United States.

Early life 
Daniels was born on December 4, 1859, to  Sylvester Daniels and Mary (Lumley) Daniels in Tipton, Iowa, the third of five children. When she was sixteen years old, she moved to her family's homestead in Northern California, becoming a farmer in the mountains. At age nineteen, she was in a wagon accident, hitting her head on the steering wheel after her skirt caught in the brake; the injury led to chronic illness.

Activity and views 
In contrast with her anarchist contemporaries, who welcomed the revolutionary potential for self-governance in the United States Declaration of Independence, Daniels considered it a trap to sucker fools into dying in a war fought for the wealthy to avoid taxes. She self-described as an Anarcho-Communist.

When the publishers of the anarchist publication Discontent were arrested under the Comstock laws in September 1901, Daniels supported the publication on the basis of freedom of speech.

Between the mid-1880s and 1910, Daniels met Sigismund Danielewicz, who became either her close friend or romantic partner.

A 1919 report by the United States Department of Justice includes Daniels' writing in the Boston Traveler about women's suffrage:

Daniels was additionally an atheist.

Publications 
Daniels contributed writing and poetry to the anarchist publications The Firebrand, Free Society, Why?, Mother Earth, and The Dawn.

Later life and death 

An 1898 health crisis led Daniels to move to San Francisco. Near the turn of the century, she married Richard Daverkosen and had one son, Hubert, born in 1900. She died in San Francisco in November 1942 and is buried in Lake City, California.

References

Citations

Bibliography 

1942 deaths
1859 births
Anarchist writers
People from Tipton, Iowa
Writers from Iowa
American atheists
19th-century American non-fiction writers
20th-century American non-fiction writers
19th-century American women writers
20th-century American women writers
American anarchists